Alfredo Domingo Obberti  (12 August 1945 – 5 July 2021) was an Argentine footballer who played as a striker for a number of clubs in Argentina and Grêmio in Brazil.

Obberti made his professional debut in 1962 playing for Huracán, he spent a season with Colón de Santa Fe in 1965 before returning to Huracán in 1966.

In 1968 Obberti joined Los Andes where he became Argentina's leading goalscorer in the Metropolitano 1968 with 13 goals. In 1969, he returned to Huracán.

In 1970 Obberti joined Newell's Old Boys where he again became topscorer in Argentina with 10 goals. In 1972, he joined Grêmio returning to Newell's in 1974. In his time with Newell's he scored 89 goals in 147 matches to make him the club's third highest goalscorer of all time.

Obberti was Grêmio's highest foreign goalscorer with 35 goals in 105 matches, until Hernán Barcos, also from Argentina, surpassed him in August 2014.

Honours
Newell's Old Boys
 Primera División Argentina: Metropolitano 1974

References

1945 births
2021 deaths
Footballers from Buenos Aires
Argentine footballers
Argentina international footballers
Association football forwards
Argentine Primera División players
Club Atlético Huracán footballers
Club Atlético Colón footballers
Club Atlético Los Andes footballers
Newell's Old Boys footballers
Grêmio Foot-Ball Porto Alegrense players
Argentine expatriate footballers
Argentine expatriate sportspeople in Brazil
Expatriate footballers in Brazil